Hans Candrian (March 6, 1938 – January 9, 1999) was a Swiss bobsledder who competed in the late 1960s and early 1970s. Competing in two Winter Olympics, he won a bronze medal in the four-man event at Grenoble in 1968. Candrian also won four medals at the FIBT World Championships with four silver (Two-man: 1973, Four-man: 1974) and two bronzes (Two-man and four-man: both 1970).

References
 Bobsleigh four-man Olympic medalists for 1924, 1932-56, and since 1964
 Bobsleigh two-man world championship medalists since 1931
 Bobsleigh four-man world championship medalists since 1930
 Wallechinsky, David (1984). "Bobsled: Two-man". In The Complete Book of the Olympics: 1896 - 1980. New York: Penguin Books. p. 559.
 Hans Candrian's obituary 

1938 births
1999 deaths
Bobsledders at the 1968 Winter Olympics
Bobsledders at the 1972 Winter Olympics
Swiss male bobsledders
Olympic bobsledders of Switzerland
Olympic bronze medalists for Switzerland
Olympic medalists in bobsleigh
Medalists at the 1968 Winter Olympics
20th-century Swiss people